Blackguard is a Canadian melodic death metal band from Montréal, Québec, previously known as Profugus Mortis.

History

Formation (2001–2008) 
Blackguard was formed in 2001 by guitarist Terry Roadcase and drummer Justine "Juice" Éthier as a straight-ahead black metal outfit. The Montreal-based sextet was originally named Profugus Mortis (Latin for "Death of a Refugee"). Blackguard was officially born with the addition of vocalist Paul Ablaze in October 2004, followed a month later by bassist Étienne Mailloux. Staying true to their black metal roots, the new Profugus Mortis turned their sights on a brutal new interpretation of Scandinavian folk metal.

Blackguard issued a four-song self-produced demo in March 2005, passing them out for free at metal shows in Montreal. In July that same year, Profugus Mortis played the Xtreme Distortion Fest in Montreal with Kataklysm and Unexpect, winning the coveted slot as "Best Unsigned Band" at the event. This translated into a support slot with Sodom and Finntroll, which earned Profugus Mortis the opportunity to open for Yngwie Malmsteen at the request of Québec's Capital du Metal.

Since then, Blackguard has supported and toured with numerous acts equally respected the world over, including Lacuna Coil, Catamenia, Warbringer, Behemoth, Therion, Into Eternity, Ensiferum, The Agonist, Cryptopsy, Krisiun, Voivod, Moonsorrow, Korpiklaani and Quo Vadis.

Profugus Mortis' first professional recording was released in March 2007 and was named So It Begins. This was rather a collection of songs showcasing the band's past and their new direction. So It Begins became the best and fastest selling album in their label Prodisk's history. In January 2008, violinist Emilie Livernois was replaced by former Gotherfall guitarist Kim Gosselin.

The band was signed to Nuclear Blast after being selected as the winners of the label's "MySpace Band Contest".  Their first major label debut was entitled Profugus Mortis as a tribute to their past.

Keyboardist Jonathan Lefrançois-Leduc left Blackguard in June 2010 after Hypocrisy's North American tour.

On October 12, 2010, it was announced that Blackguard had switched from Nuclear Blast to Victory Records.

Firefight (2009–2011) 
After touring for several months before the release of their next album, Firefight, they began selling pre-orders for the album, which was released on March 29, 2011, through Victory Records. During the subsequent tour for Firefight, the band announced the departure of guitarist Kim Gosselin and welcomed Louis Jacques to the band as his replacement.

The band released this statement about it: "Unfortunately we must officially announce the departure of lead guitarist Kim Gosselin from Blackguard. For those of you who have seen us play during our last few tours this will not come as a shock seeing as Kim has been absent from the live lineup for quite some time."

"Kim has decided not to continue with the band, and we'd like to thank him for his invaluable contribution to this group over the years. As hard as it is seeing a brother go, this is truly the best thing for both parties as Kim's interest in touring and writing have been waning over the last year. We wanted to wait until we had found a suitable replacement before making any official announcement and we're very happy to finally be able to let everyone in on what's going on."

Storm (2012–present) 
On June 17, 2012, Blackguard announced they have begun work on their next studio album.

Vocalist Paul Zinay released this official statement on the band's progress: "We are currently hard at work and pre-production is coming along very nice. Everyone here is ecstatic over the material we have. Our new guitarist Louis is a riff machine and working his ass off to help make this the best Blackguard album to date. The writing process this time around is unlike anything we've done before. In the past, one or two people would make up the vast majority of material for the album. This time, however, everyone is contributing ideas and music and the results are beyond my expectations."

"We will be heading into studio in September to start tracking and we're hoping to have the record out in early 2013. Lyrically, I'm taking a step into new territory by trying my hand at writing a concept album. This won't be as intricate or vast as The Emerald Sword Saga or The Metal Opera, but this will be an exciting and new challenge for me nonetheless."

After some delays, Blackguard returned to the studio in May 2013 for their new album Storm at Silver Wings Studios in Montreal, QC. Initial sessions for the album were thought to have taken place back in September. On October 31, 2013, the band announced the departure of bassist Etienne Mailloux from their lineup. The group then enlisted Dave "Ablaze" Zinay as his replacement. Dave is the twin brother of the band's lead vocalist, Paul.

On May 10, 2014, the band announced on their Facebook page that Vocalist Paul Zinay will be finishing vocal tracks for Storm. On September 22, 2014, the band announced via Facebook, that the album was done. The release date was January 3, 2020.

Touring 
Blackguard have participated in the following tours:
Paganfest America 2009 (Korpiklaani, Primordial, Moonsorrow, Swashbuckle)
Summer Slaughter Tour America 2009 (Necrophagist, Suffocation, Ensiferum, Darkest Hour, Winds of Plague, Dying Fetus, etc.)
Tour from Afar North America 2009 (Ensiferum, Hypocrisy, Ex Deo)
Design Your Universe Tour 2010 (Epica, Threat Signal)
A Taste of Extreme Divinity Tour 2010 (Hypocrisy, Scar Symmetry, Hate, Swashbuckle)
Pandemonium over North America 2010 (Kamelot, Leaves' Eyes)
The Obsidian Conspiracy Tour 2010 (Nevermore, Hatesphere, and Warbringer)
Design Your Universe Tour 2010, 2nd American Leg (Epica, Scar Symmetry, The Agonist)
God Is Dead, To Hell with God Tour 2011 (Deicide, Belphegor, Neuraxis, and Pathology)
Firefight over Europe Tour 2011 (Headlining)
Symphony X North American Tour 2011 (Symphony X and Powerglove)
Otep North American Tour 2011 (Otep, Sister Sin, Destrophy, One Eyed Doll)
Pandemonium over North America 2011 (Kamelot, Alestorm, The Agonist)
North American Collision Tour 2011 (Evergrey, Sabaton, Powerglove, The Absence)
I've Failed You North American Tour 2012 (Kittie, The Agonist, Bonded by Blood)
Silverthorn European Tour 2012 (Kamelot, Xandria, Triosphere)
The Living Infinite Tour 2013 (Soilwork, Jeff Loomis, Bonded by Blood, Hatchet)
Blodsvept North American Tour 2013 (Finntroll, Metsatöll)

Members 
Terry "Roadcase" Deschenes – rhythm guitar (2001–present)
Justine "Juice" Ethier – drums (2001–present)
Paul "Ablaze" Zinay – vocals (2004–present)

Live members 
Chris Kells – bass (2012–present)
David Gagné – lead guitar (2013–present)

Former members 
Louis Jacques (2012–2015) – lead guitar
Étienne Mailloux (2004–2013) – bass
Kim Gosselin (2008–2012) – lead guitar
Jonathan Lefrançois-Leduc (2003–2010) – keyboards, synthesizers
Émilie Livernois (2003–2007) – violin, live growls
Alkin (François Auger) (2001–2004) – vocals
Mordred (2003–2004) – bass
Erik Tisinger (2011) – touring lead guitar
Gabriel Guardian (2011–2012) – touring lead guitar

Producers 
Jean-François Dagenais (So It Begins, Profugus Mortis) – mixed and engineered for studio recording
 Jonathan Lefrançois-Leduc (Storm) mixed and engineered for studio recording

Discography

Studio albums 
So It Begins (2007)
Profugus Mortis (2009)
Firefight (2011)
Storm (2020)

EPs 
Another Round (EP)|Another Round (2008)

Singles 
"United Under a Shadowed Nightsky" (2004)
"Firefight" (2011)

Demos 
United Under a Shadowed Nightsky (2003)
Démo (2005)

References

External links 

2003 establishments in Canada
Canadian death metal musical groups
Canadian folk metal musical groups
Musical groups established in 2003
Musical quintets